Ayak Thiik (also known as, "Ayak Tracks") is a South Sudanese singer-songwriter and vocal producer. She is primarily known for writing hit songs and appearing on vocals for artists like Diana Ross, Cee Lo Green, James Morrison ("You Make It Real"), Chip ("Until You Were Gone"), Tinchy Stryder ("Never Leave You and "In My System"), and Dappy ("No Regrets" and "Rockstar"), among others.

Background
Ayak Thiik's love for music was evident at an early age, and she was able to sing long before she was able to talk. Ayak Thiik had signed a record deal with German record label Stereo Wonderland, Polydor, Universal and recorded an album – making her the first Sudanese artist to be signed by a major label worldwide. Thiik entered and won the Princes Trust Urban Music Festival's – Unsigned Talent Search, in the United Kingdom. She ultimately won a spot in a line-up which featured Beyoncé, as well as Alicia Keys and a host of top UK artists.

Song writing and vocal production
In 2006, Ayak Thiik wrote and featured on the Cincinnati native hip-hop producer Hi-Tek's second album, 'Hi-Teknology²: The Chip’. The track "Can we Go back" also featured Talib Kweli. Since then she has ventured into the house music world, working with German producers Milk & Sugar. Her dance music collaborations with Milk & Sugar have clocked up two consecutive UK chart toppers at number 1 and 2. Thiik's house music endeavors have taken her to Brazil, Singapore, Moscow, Russia and Lebanon.
 
Having spent 18 months working on her songwriting, she was offered a deal and signed by Takeover Entertainment. She has penned songs for Kelly Rowland, Mica Paris, Esmée Denters, JLS, Chip, Tinchy Stryder, The Wanted, Alexandra Burke, Lemar and Roc Nation's signed Bridget Kelly, among others.
 
Her vocals have also appeared on Tinchy Stryder's "Never Leave You" – Catch 22 album, "In My System", "Take the World" – Third Strike album, Kylie Minogue's "Everything is beautiful" – Aphrodite album, James Morrison's "You Make It Real – Songs For You Truths For Me album, Cheryl Cole's "Stand up" – 3 Words album, Cee-Lo Green's "Satisfied" – The Lady killer album, among others.
 
In 2010, Thiik gained her first UK Singles Chart record as co-writer on Chip's "Until You Were Gone" featuring Esmée Denters. This went into the UK singles charts as at No. 3. She also co-wrote Tinchy Stryder's No. 10 hit "In My System", on which she also appeared on vocals but not the music video.

Solo career
Ayak Thiik recorded and released a studio album entitled, Voices in My Head. Her list of musical achievements continues. Ayak Thiik was featured on Liberty Bell Jolly Good TV Sky Arts 'Song Book' show by chance, after coming to the rescue of her hero and arguably the most successful songwriter of current generation Diane Warren who wrote the hits "Un-Break My Heart" (1996) by Toni Braxton, "How Do I Live Without You" (1997) by LeAnn Rimes, "I Don't Want to Miss a Thing (1998) by Aerosmith, and for many other artists. Taken aback by Ayak Thiik's voice, Diane Warren has begun writing songs for Ayak Thiik and is determined to make her a star in her own right. A documentary chronicling this will be filmed by the same production team.

Selected production and writing credits

Source:

References

Takeover Entertainment artists
Living people
1983 births
People from Juba
South Sudanese singer-songwriters
South Sudanese singers
South Sudanese songwriters
South Sudanese record producers
Hip hop record producers
Hip hop singers
Women hip hop musicians